Mary O'Connor (born 1977 in Killeagh, County Cork) is an Irish sportsperson. A dual player, she played both ladies' Gaelic football and camogie.  As a footballer O Connor has played with her local clubs Donoughmore and Inch Rovers and was a member of the Cork county ladies' football team at senior level from 1994 until 2010. She has won five All-Ireland titles. As a camogie player O'Connor played for her local club Killeagh and was a member of the Cork county camogie team at senior level since 1996. Since then she has won seven All-Ireland titles. O'Connor is one of the most decorated players in the history of Gaelic games. Winner of All Ireland camogie medals in 1997 (when her last point of the first half off her left side, scored as she was in full flight 50 yards out, is regarded as one of the best scores in the history of camogie ), 1998, 2002, 2005, 2006, 2008 and 2009 and All Star awards in 2005, 2006 and 2009.

Career
She holds seven Senior All-Ireland and nine National League camogie medals as well as county, provincial and two All Ireland Club medals with Granagh-Ballingarry whom she played with while studying and working in Limerick.

Awards
She was the overall winner of the 96/103fm Rochestown Park Hotel award following her performances in the All-Ireland and National League finals in 2006. she received the vodafone camogie player of the year award in 2006, As well as her three All Star awards she was nominated for further awards in 2004, 2008 and 2009, and received an unofficial Lynchpin award in 2003.

Football
She captained Cork to a fifth successive All-Ireland football title in 2009 having won an All Star Award in ladies' football in 2006.

References

External links 
 Profile in Cúl4kidz magazine
 Official Camogie Website
 Fixtures and results for the 2009 O'Duffy Cup
 All-Ireland Senior Camogie Championship: Roll of Honour
 Video highlights of 2009 championship Part One and part two
 Video Highlights of 2009 All Ireland Senior Final
 Report of All Ireland final in Irish Times Independent and Examiner

 

1977 births
Living people
Cork inter-county ladies' footballers
Cork camogie players
Dual camogie–football players
Winners of four All-Ireland medals (ladies' football)